West Mill railway station served the village of Westmill, Hertfordshire, England, from 1863 to 1964 on the Buntingford branch line.

History 
The station was opened on 3 July 1863 by the Great Eastern Railway. It was situated on the north side of a minor road. It was known as Westmill until 1883 in the railway handbook. On the up side was a goods siding with a goods shed adjacent to it. The goods facilities closed on 7 September 1964 and the station closed on 16 November 1964.

References 

Disused railway stations in Hertfordshire
Former Great Eastern Railway stations
Railway stations in Great Britain opened in 1863
Railway stations in Great Britain closed in 1964
1863 establishments in England
1964 disestablishments in England
Beeching closures in England